Timothy Wright (born April 7, 1990) is a former American football tight end. He was signed by the Tampa Bay Buccaneers as an undrafted free agent in 2013. He played college football at Rutgers, where he subsequently opened a barbershop in 2016.

He grew up in Neptune, New Jersey. He went to Green Grove Elementary School. As a  teen played high school football at Wall High School.

College football
Wright played wide receiver at Rutgers under head coach Greg Schiano for his first couple of years. Schiano was also his head coach in the NFL for his rookie season with the Tampa Bay Buccaneers.

Professional career

Tampa Bay Buccaneers
On April 29, 2013, Wright was signed as an undrafted free agent by the Tampa Bay Buccaneers. On June 12, 2013, Wright was moved from wide receiver to tight end. Wright played all 16 games for the Buccaneers, starting 8. He finished the season with 54 catches for 571 yards and 5 touchdowns, the yards and touchdowns tied for the most by an undrafted rookie tight end in NFL history. Wright was the only rookie tight end in 2013 to have more than 500 receiving yards.

New England Patriots
On August 26, 2014, Wright was traded by the Buccaneers to the New England Patriots along with a 2015 4th round draft pick for guard Logan Mankins.
Wright played in 11 games for the Patriots, catching 26 passes for 259 yards, with a career-high 6 touchdowns. Wright played in the Patriots Super Bowl XLIX victory over the Seattle Seahawks, but did not record any catches. He was released on June 11, 2015.

Return to Tampa Bay
On June 12, 2015, the Tampa Bay Buccaneers claimed Wright off waivers.

Detroit Lions
On August 31, 2015, the Buccaneers traded Wright to the Detroit Lions in exchange for placekicker Kyle Brindza. During the 2015 season, Wright appeared in nine games for the Lions, where he finished with nine receptions for 77 yards and two touchdowns. On March 16, 2016, the Lions re-signed Wright to a one-year contract. On May 31, 2016, he was placed on season-ending injured reserve with a torn ACL.

On August 9, 2017, Wright re-signed with the Lions. He was released on August 28, 2017.

Kansas City Chiefs
On April 9, 2018, Wright was signed by the Kansas City Chiefs. He was released on September 1, 2018.

Career statistics

References

External links
New England Patriots bio
Tampa Bay Buccaneers bio
Rutgers Scarlet Knights bio

1990 births
Living people
American football tight ends
American football wide receivers
Detroit Lions players
Kansas City Chiefs players
New England Patriots players
People from Wall Township, New Jersey
Players of American football from New Jersey
Rutgers Scarlet Knights football players
Sportspeople from Monmouth County, New Jersey
Wall High School (New Jersey) alumni
Tampa Bay Buccaneers players